Epitacio Huerta is a municipality in the Mexican state of Michoacán, located approximately  northeast of the state capital of Morelia. It is named after General , who fought in the Mexican–American War and under Juan Álvarez in the Revolution of Ayutla, and served as governor of Michoacán from 1858 to 1862.

Geography
It borders the Queretan municipalities of Huimilpan to the north and Amealco de Bonfil to the northeast, the Michoacanese municipalities of Contepec to the southeast and Maravatío to the southwest, and the Guanajuatean municipalities of Jerécuaro to the southwest and Coroneo to the northwest.

As of 2009, farmland covered 59% of Epitacio Huerta's land area, while grasslands covered 22% and forests cover 14%. 

The reservoir of the Tepuxtepec Dam on the Lerma River forms part of Epitacio Huerta's southern border with Contepec. Built from 1926 to 1950, the dam and its reservoir are used for hydroelectricity generation, flood control and irrigation.

Epitacio Huerta's climate is temperate with rain in the summer.

History
At the time of Spanish contact, the area of what is now Epitacio Huerta was a buffer zone between the Tarascan state to the west and the Aztec Empire to the east, and was inhabited by the Guamare and Pame peoples. By 1632 the ranch of San José Buena Vista was established in what was then the hacienda of Coroneo. In 1822, San José Buena Vista was itself recorded as a hacienda attached to Tlalpujahua.

In 1962, San José Buena Vista was renamed in honour of General Epitacio Huerta. Effective 31 March 1962, it and the surrounding localities were separated from Contepec to form the municipality of Epitacio Huerta, in accordance with Decree No. 83 of 1 March 1962.

Administration
The municipal government comprises a president, a councillor (Spanish: síndico), and seven trustees (regidores), four elected by relative majority and three by proportional representation. The current president of the municipality is Margarito Fierros.

Demographics
In the 2010 Mexican Census, the municipality of Epitacio Huerta recorded a population of 16,218 inhabitants living in 3992 households. The 2015 Intercensal Survey estimated a population of 16,622 inhabitants in Epitacio Huerta.

There are 82 localities in the municipality, of which only the municipal seat, also known as Epitacio Huerta, is classified as urban. It recorded a population of 1222 inhabitants in the 2010 Census.

Economy
Agriculture is the main economic activity in Epitacio Huerta.

References

Municipalities of Michoacán
1962 establishments in Mexico
States and territories established in 1962